Unedogemmula bisaya is a species of sea snail, a marine gastropod mollusk in the family Turridae, the turrids.

Description
The length of the shell varies between 40 mm and 75 mm.

Distribution
This marine species occurs off the Philippines.

References

 Patterson Edward, J. K.; Ravinesh, R. & Biju Kumar, A. (2022). Molluscs of the Gulf of Mannar, India and adjacent waters: A fully illustrated guide. Suganthi Devadason Marien Research Institute & Department of Aquatic Biology and Fisheries, University of Kerala. Tuticorin. i-xx, 1-524.

External links
 Olivera, Baldomero. "Larger forms in Lophiotoma: four new species described in the Philippines and three from elsewhere in the Indo-Pacific." Science Diliman 16.1 (2004).
 Gastropods.com: Gemmula (Unedogemmula) bisaya

bisaya
Gastropods described in 2004